John Edward Ker (born 17 October 1952) is a Scottish former cricketer and administrator.

Ker was born at Kelso in October 1952, where he was educated at Kelso High School before going up to Jordanhill College of Education. A club cricketer for Kelso Cricket Club, Ker made his debut for Scotland in a first-class match against Ireland at Dublin in 1977. He played first-class cricket for Scotland until 1988, with ten of his appearances coming against Ireland; the other two came against the touring New Zealanders in 1978 and the touring Sri Lankans the following year. A bowling all-rounder, Ker scored 189 runs at an average of 21.00 in first-class cricket, with a highest score of 50. With his right-arm medium pace bowling, he took 19 wickets at a bowling average of 25.36, with best figures of 4 for 54. In addition to playing first-class cricket for Scotland, Ker also appeared in List A one-day matches for them on 24 occasions between 1980 and 1988 in the Benson & Hedges Cup and the NatWest Trophy. He scored 144 runs in one-day cricket, with a highest score of 31. With the ball, he took 22 wickets at an average of 31.36, with best figures of 3 for 29.

Ker was appointed President of Cricket Scotland in 2012, a role he held until 2013. He has also served as president of Kelso Cricket Club. Outside of cricket, Ker was a schoolteacher, before working in the insurance industry. His brother is the former cricketer and rugby union international Andrew Ker.

References

External links
 

1952 births
Living people
People from Kelso, Scottish Borders
People educated at Kelso High School, Scotland
Scottish schoolteachers
Scottish cricketers
Scottish cricket administrators